is a 2006 cell phone novel series written by Mei. Akai Ito was first published on the website Mahō no Toshōkan, where it became the #1 ranked story within the first month of publication. The popularity of Akai Ito has been associated with the boom of cell phone novels in the mid-2000s in Japan. The novel was later published as a series of five books, which sold a consecutive total of 1.8 million physical copies.

The success of Akai Ito has led to a manga adaptation by Cocco Kashiwaya, a television and film project released under the title Threads of Destiny, and two video game adaptations.

Plot

Middle school student Mei Takemiya has a crush on her childhood friend Yūya, but after he confesses to her older sister, Haruna, she withdraws to the company of her circle of friends: Riku, Mia, Yuri, Natsuki, Mitsuru, Asami, and Sara. One day, she becomes acquainted with her classmate, Atsushi Nishino, and the two realize they have a lot in common, including sharing the same birthday and encountering each other when they were young. As Mei and Atsushi become closer, they fall in love and believe to be each other's soulmate.

However, when Atsushi's troubled home life catches up to him, he distances himself from Mei. Mei begins dating Riku, who becomes increasingly abusive, while their circle of friends encounter situations involving drugs, rape, and attempted suicide. In spite of this, Mei struggles to hold onto her belief that she will overcome her obstacles, and the red string of fate will eventually lead her to her true love.

Characters

Main characters

Portrayed by: Nao Minamisawa
Mei is a gentle and kind middle school student who believes in destiny.

Portrayed by: Junpei Mizobata; 
Atsushi is a quiet boy in Mei's class who is nicknamed . His mother is a drug addict, and he spends his time taking care of her.

Supporting characters

Portrayed by: Ryo Kimura; 
Riku is one of Mei's friends and is nicknamed . He has been secretly in love with her and they decide to date after Mei and Atsushi break up. However, in spite of his cheerful personality, he starts growing possessive of Mei and eventually starts becoming abusive towards her.

Portrayed by: Tomo Yanagishita; 

Portrayed by: Kasumi Suzuki; 

Portrayed by: Ryo Tajima; 

Portrayed by: Rei Okamoto; 

Portrayed by: Anna Ishibashi; 

Portrayed by: Nanami Sakuraba; 
Sara is one of Mei's friends and is in love with Riku. Upon discovering he is in love with Mei, she attempts suicide but survives the incident with amnesia.

Portrayed by: Hiroshi Yazaki; 
Yūya is Mei and Haruna's childhood friend, and Mei has been in love with him since childhood. However, he is in love with Haruna and confesses to her.

Portrayed by: Sayuri Iwata; 
Haruna is Mei's older sister.

Minor characters

Portrayed by: Kaoru Hirata

Portrayed by: Ryuya Wakaba

Portrayed by: Kenji Matsuda

Portrayed by: Mirai Yamamoto

Portrayed by: Shigemitsu Ogi

Portrayed by: Noriko Watanabe

Media

Novels

Akai Ito is written by Mei and was posted on the website Mahō no Toshōkan in 2006. Throughout its run, 3.3 million readers were subscribed to the story, and it was consistently ranked at #1 on the website. Media referenced Akai Ito as one of the leaders of the "cell phone novel" phenomenon in the mid-2000s along with Koizora. Akai Ito had over 16 million views by 2008. The chapters were later compiled and released as bound volumes by Goma Books. The consecutive sales of all books sold more than 1.8 million copies.

Re-releases

Goma Books re-released the Akai Ito series under the Goma Bunko imprint, with stories divided into 3 books, on April 28, 2009.

Manga

A manga adaptation illustrated by Cocco Kashiwaya was released from 2008 to 2009 in bound volumes published by Goma Books under the Orion Comics imprint.

Television series

A live-action television drama series and a film adaptation was announced in April 2008 and produced simultaneously. Production for both adaptations completed on November 20, 2008. The television broadcast aired on Fuji TV from December 6, 2008 to February 28, 2009, for a total of 11 episodes. A DVD box set for the television series was released on July 15, 2009, and it charted at #68 on the Oricon Weekly DVD Charts.

Film

A continuation of the first half of the television broadcast was released as a theatrical film on December 20, 2008 and concluded with a "To be continued" intertitle for the second half of the television series. The film was produced simultaneously with the television series and concluded production in November 2008. The film was released on DVD in standard and special editions on May 29, 2009, charting at #29 on the Oricon Weekly DVD Charts. Russell Edwards from Variety called some of the secondary plot points "ridiculous", but found the actors likeable.

Video games

A video game adaptation titled  was produced by Alchemist released on the Nintendo DS on December 25, 2008. The game was first announced on October 14, 2008 and is a visual novel dating simulation where the player takes control of Mei's choices while navigating through the story.

A sequel, titled Akai Ito Destiny DS, was released on the Nintendo DS on March 26, 2009. The limited edition sold by Animate came with a drama CD featuring Jun Fukuyama, Hiroki Takahashi, and Tomokazu Sugita, the voice actors of Atsushi, Natsuki, and Kaito.

References

External links
  

2008 Japanese television series debuts
2009 Japanese television series endings
Films based on Japanese novels
Fuji TV dramas
Japanese drama television series
Japanese romance television series
Novels first published online
Television shows based on Japanese novels